{{Infobox settlement
| name                     = Oromia
| native_name              = ኦሮሚያ
| native_name_lang         = om
| settlement_type          = Regional state
| image_skyline            = {{Photomontage
 | photo1a      = Oromia Cultural Center Addis Ababa.jpg
 | photo2a      = Irreecha Festival.jpg
 | photo2b      = Sof Omer Cave, Ethiopia (23194314604).jpg
 | photo3a      = Lake wenchi crater.jpg
 | photo4a      = Harenna Forest (16139095228).jpg
 | photo4b      = Abijatta-Shalla National Park in Ethiopia 04.jpg
 | spacing      = 1
 | size         = 250
 | position     = center
 | border       = 0
 | color        = #000000
 | foot_montage = From top, left to right:Oromia Cultural Center, Irreechaa, Sof Omar Caves,  Wonchi Lake, Bale Mountains National Park and Lake Shalla
 }}
| image_alt                = 
| image_caption            = 
| image_flag               = Flag of the Oromia Region.svg
| image_seal               = Oromia Region emblem.png
| seal_alt                 = 
| image_shield             = 
| shield_alt               = 
| nickname                 = 
| motto                    = 
| mottoeng                 = 
| image_map                = Ethiopia-Oromia.png
| map_alt                  = 
| map_caption              = Map of Ethiopia showing Oromia
| pushpin_map              = 
| pushpin_label_position   = 
| pushpin_map_alt          = 
| pushpin_map_caption      = 
| coordinates_footnotes    = 
| subdivision_type         = Country
| subdivision_name         = 
| subdivision_type1        = Official language
| subdivision_name1        = Oromo
| subdivision_type1l2      = 
| subdivision_name2        = 
| subdivision_type3        = 
| subdivision_name3        = 
| established_title        = 
| established_date         = 
| founder                  = 
| parts_type               = 
| parts_style              = 
| parts                    = 
| p1                       = 
| p2                       = 
| seat_type                = Capital
| seat                     = Addis Ababa (Finfinne)
| government_footnotes     = 
| leader_party             = Prosperity Party
| leader_title             = Chief Administrator
| leader_name              = Shimelis Abdisa
| unit_pref                = Metric
| area_footnotes           = 
| area_rank                = 1st
| area_total_km2           = 353,690
| elevation_footnotes      = 
| elevation_m              = 
| population_footnotes     = 
| population_total         = 35,467,001
| population_as_of         = 2017
| population_density_km2   = auto
| population_rank          = 1st
| population_demonym       = Oromo or Oromian
| population_note          = 
| timezone1                = EAT
| utc_offset1              = 
| timezone1_DST            = 
| utc_offset1_DST          = 
| postal_code_type         = 
| postal_code              = 
| area_code_type           = 
| area_code                = 
| iso_code                 = ET-OR
| blank_name_sec1          = HDI (2019)
| blank_info_sec1          = 0.470 · 8th of 11
| website                  = 
| footnotes                = 
}}

Oromia is a regional state in Ethiopia and the homeland of the Oromo people. The capital of Oromia is Addis Ababa.

It is bordered by the Somali Region to the east; the Amhara Region, the Afar Region and the Benishangul-Gumuz Region to the north; Dire Dawa to the northeast; the South Sudanese state of Upper Nile, Gambela Region, South West Ethiopia Region, Southern Nations, Nationalities, and Peoples' Region and Sidama Region to the west; the Eastern Province of Kenya to the south; as well as Addis Ababa as an enclave surrounded by a Special Zone in its centre and the Harari Region as an enclave surrounded by East Hararghe in its east.

In August 2013, the Ethiopian Central Statistics Agency projected the 2022 population of Oromia as 35,467,001; making it the largest regional state by population. It is also the largest regional state covering  Oromia is the world's 42nd most populous subnational entity, and the most populous subnational entity in Africa.

History

The Oromo people are one of the oldest cushitic peoples inhabiting the Horn of Africa, as there is still no correct estimate of the history of their settlement in the region.An evidence is given that they are the womb from which most of the eastern Cushitic peoples emerged, such as the Somalis, Afaris, and the Saho in Eritrea and Sudan. Oromos make up the largest aboriginal people Horn of Africa, mainly Ethiopia until the 10th century. After the influx of Abyssinian people of Northern Ethiopia, who claim to have an Arabian and Jewish ancestry, Oromos and other native Ethiopian people such as Agaw, Kimant, Gafat, Ifates, etc. were gradually driven out of North-Central Ethiopia. These newly arriving South Arabian settlers who refer themselves as Habesha gradually expanded South-ward, intermarried with native people of Ethiopia and seized power around 1270, establishing the so called Solomonic Dynasty which ruled Ethiopia from 1270-1974. Despite their well-documented Arabian and Jewish origin, these newly arriving groups of Ethiopians often refer to aboriginal people of Central and Southern Ethiopia as immigrants as they say "Accuse Your Enemy Of What You Are Doing, As You Are Doing It To Create Confusion".Aksum: An African Civilisation of Late Antiquity by Stuart Munro-Hay, 1991

The Oromo and their country Oromia (biyyi Oromiyaa) remained independent until the last quarter of the 19th century, when they lost their sovereignty. From 1881 to 1886, Emperor Menelik II conducted several unsuccessful invasion campaigns against their territory. The Arsi Oromo demonstrated fierce resistance against this Abyssinian conquest, putting up stiff opposition against an enemy equipped with modern European firearms. They were ultimately defeated in 1886.

In the 1940s some Arsi Oromo together with people from Bale province joined the Harari Kulub movement, an affiliate of the Somali Youth League that opposed Amhara Christian domination of Hararghe. The Ethiopian government violently suppressed these ethno-religious movements. During the 1970s the Arsi formed alliances with Somalia.

In 1967, the imperial regime of Haile Selassie I outlawed the Mecha and Tulama Self-Help Association (MTSHA), an Oromo social movement, and conducted mass arrests and executions of its members. The group's leader, Colonel General Tadesse Birru, who was a prominent military officer, was among those arrested. The actions by the regime sparked outrage among the Oromo community, ultimately leading to the formation of the Oromo Liberation Front in 1973. The Oromos perceived the rule of Emperor Haile Selassie as oppressive, as the Oromo language was banned from education and use in administration, and speakers were privately and publicly mocked. The Amhara culture dominated throughout the eras of military and monarchic rule.

Both the imperial and the Derg government relocated numerous Amharas into southern Ethiopia, including the present day Oromia region, in order to alleviate drought in the north of the country. They also served in government administration, courts, church and even in school, where Oromo texts were eliminated and replaced by Amharic. Further disruption under the Derg regime came through the forced concentration and resettlement of peasant communities in fewer villages. The Abyssinian elites perceived the Oromo identity and languages as opposing the expansion of an Ethiopian national identity.

In the early 1990s, the Ethiopian Democratic People's Republic began to lose its control over Ethiopia. The OLF failed to maintain strong alliances with the other two rebel groups at the time: the Eritrean People's Liberation Front (EPLF) and the Tigray People's Liberation Front (TPLF). In 1990, the TPLF created an umbrella organization for several rebel groups in Ethiopia, the Ethiopian People's Revolutionary Democratic Front (EPRDF). The EPRDF's Oromo subordinate, the Oromo People's Democratic Organization (OPDO) was seen as an attempted replacement for the OLF.

On 28 May 1991, the EPRDF seized power and established a transitional government. The EPRDF and the OLF pledged to work together in the new government; however, they were largely unable to cooperate, as the OLF saw the OPDO as an EPRDF ploy to limit their influence. In 1992, the OLF announced that it was withdrawing from the transitional government because of "harassment and [the]assassinations of its members". In response, the EPRDF sent soldiers to destroy OLA camps. Despite initial victories against the EPRDF, the OLF were eventually overwhelmed by the EPRDF's superior numbers and weaponry, forcing OLA soldiers to use guerrilla warfare instead of traditional tactics. In the late 1990s, most of the OLF's leaders had escaped Ethiopia, and the land originally administered by the OLF had been seized by the Ethiopian government, now led by the EPRDF.

Prior to the establishment of present-day Addis Ababa the location was called Finfinne in Oromo, a name which refers to the presence of hot springs. The area was previously inhabited by various Oromo clans.

In 2000, Oromia's capital was moved from Addis Ababa to Adama. Because this move sparked considerable controversy and protests among Oromo students, the Oromo Peoples' Democratic Organization (OPDO), part of the ruling EPRDF coalition, on 10 June 2005, officially announced plans to move the regional capital back to Addis Ababa.

Further protests sparked on 25 April 2014, against the Addis Ababa Master Plan, then resumed on 12 September 2015 and continued into 2016, when renewed protests broke out across Ethiopia, centering around the Oromia region. Dozens of protesters were killed in the first days of the protests and internet service was cut in many parts of the region. In 2019, the Irreecha festival was celebrated in Addis Ababa after 150 years of being banned.

Geography

Oromia includes the former Arsi Province along with portions of the former Bale, Illubabor, Kaffa, Shewa and Sidamo provinces. Oromia shares a boundary with almost every region of Ethiopia except for the Tigray Region. These boundaries have been disputed in a number of cases, most notably between Oromia and the Somali Region. One attempt to resolve the dispute between the two regions was the October 2004 referendum held in about 420 kebeles in 12 districts across five zones of the Somali Region. According to the official results of the referendum, about 80% of the disputed areas have fallen under Oromia administration, though there were allegations of voting irregularities in many of them. The results led over the following weeks to minorities in these kebeles being pressured to leave. In Oromiya, estimates based on figures given by local district and kebele authorities suggest that 21,520 people have become internally displaced persons (IDPs) in border districts, namely Mieso, Doba, and Erer in the West Hararghe Zone and East Hararghe Zones. Federal authorities believe that this number may be overstated by as much as 11,000. In Doba, the Ministry of Federal Affairs put the number of IDPs at 6,000. There are also more than 2,500 displaced persons in Mieso. In addition, there were reports of people being displaced in the border area of Moyale and Borena zones due to this conflict.

Towns in the region include Adama, Ambo, Asella, Badessa, Bale Robe, Bedele, Bishoftu, Begi, Bule Hora, Burayu, Chiro, Dembidolo, Fiche, Gimbi, Goba, Haramaya, Holeta, Jimma, Koye Feche, Metu, Negele Arsi, Nekemte, Sebeta, Shashamane and Waliso, among many others.

Demographics

At the time of the 2007 census conducted by the Central Statistical Agency of Ethiopia (CSA), Oromia region had a total population of 26,993,933, consisting of 13,595,006 men and 13,398,927 women; urban inhabitants numbered 3,317,460 or 11.3% of the population. For the entire region 5,590,530 households were counted, which resulted in an average for the region of 4.8 persons to a household, with urban households having on average 3.8 and rural households 5.0 people. The projected population for 2017 was 35,467,001.

In the previous census, conducted in 1994, the region's population was reported to be 17,088,136; urban inhabitants number 621,210 or 14% of the population.

According to the CSA, 32% of the population had access to safe drinking water, of whom 23.7% were rural inhabitants and 91.03% were urban. Values for other reported common indicators of the standard of living for Oromia  include the following: 19.9% of the inhabitants fall into the lowest wealth quintile; adult literacy for men is 61.5% and for women 29.5%; and the regional infant mortality rate is 76 infant deaths per 1,000 live births, which is about the same as the nationwide average of 77; at least half of these deaths occurred in the infants' first month of life.

Ethnic groups

Religion

Languages

Oromo is written with Latin characters known as Qubee, only formally adopted in 1991 after various other  Latin-based orthographies had been used previously.

Oromo is one of the official working languages of Ethiopia and is also the working language of several of the states within the Ethiopian federal system including Oromia, Harari and Dire Dawa regional states and of the Oromia Zone in the Amhara Region. It is a language of primary education in Oromia, Harari and of the Oromia Zone in the Amhara Region. It is used as an internet language for federal websites along with Tigrinya.

There are more than 33.8% Oromo speakers in Ethiopia and it is considered the most widely spoken language in Ethiopia. It is also the most widely spoken Cushitic language and the fourth-most widely spoken language of Africa, after Arabic, Hausa and Swahili languages. Forms of Oromo are spoken as a first language by more than 35 million Oromo people in Ethiopia and by an additional half-million in parts of northern and eastern Kenya. It is also spoken by smaller numbers of emigrants in other African countries such as South Africa, Libya, Egypt and Sudan.
Besides first language speakers, a number of members of other ethnicities who are in contact with the Oromo speak it as a second language. See, for example, Harari, Omotic-speaking Bambassi and the Nilo-Saharan-speaking Kwama in northwestern, eastern and south Oromia.

Economy

Oromia is a major contributor to Ethiopia's main exports - gold, coffee, khat and cattle. Lega Dembi in Guji Zone, owned by MIDROC has exported more than 5000 kilograms of gold, followed by Tulu Kapi gold deposit in West Welega Zone. Awoday in East Hararghe Zone is the biggest market of khat exporting to Djibouti and Somalia. Oromia also has more abundant livestock than any other region of Ethiopia, including camels. It is also the largest producer of cereals and coffee.

The CSA reported that, from 2004 to 2005, 115,083 tons of coffee were produced in Oromia, based on inspection records from the Ethiopian Coffee and Tea Authority. This represents 50.7% of the total production in Ethiopia. Farmers in the Region had an estimated total of 17,214,540 cattle (representing 44.4% of Ethiopia's total cattle), 6,905,370 sheep (39.6), 4,849,060 goats (37.4%), 959,710 horses (63.25%), 63,460 mules (43.1%), 278,440 asses (11.1%), 139,830 camels (30.6%), 11,637,070 poultry of all species (37.7%), and 2,513,790 beehives (57.73%).

According to a March 2003 World Bank publication, the average rural household has 1.14 hectares of land compared to the national average of 1.01 hectares. 24% of the population work in non-farm related jobs compared to the national average of 25%.

Educational institutions

Adama University
Ambo University
Arsi University
Dambi Dollo University
Dandii Boruu University College
Haramaya University
Jimma Teachers College
Jimma University
Madda Walabu University
Mattu University
New Generation University College
Oda Bultum University 
Oromia State University
Rift Valley University College 
Wollega University

List of Chief Administrator of Oromia Region

Administrative zones

Oromia is subdivided into 21 administrative zones, in turn divided into districts (weredas'').

See also
Barchaa, cultural custom and social relations

Notes

References

External links

 Map of Oromia Region at UN-OCHA (PDF file)
 FDRE States: Basic Information – Oromia

Media
 Oromia Culture and Tourism Bureau
 Oromia President office
 Sheger Times
 Oromia TV

 
Ethiopian Highlands
 
Regions of Ethiopia